Vincent Tobias Evans (born June 14, 1955) is a former professional American football quarterback who was selected by the Chicago Bears in the sixth round (140th overall pick) of the 1977 NFL Draft. Evans played college football at the University of Southern California (USC) and was the MVP of the 1977 Rose Bowl after the Trojans' 14–6 victory over Michigan.

Evans played professionally for the Bears as well as Chicago's team in the United States Football League (USFL), the Chicago Blitz, as well as the USFL's Denver Gold, and the NFL's Los Angeles/Oakland Raiders in a career that spanned nearly 20 years from 1977 to 1995. In 1976, he threw for 1,440 yards with 10 touchdowns and six interceptions.  He completed 53.7% of his passes.

Evans is the only player of the Bears to score a perfect quarterback rating in a game, doing so against the Green Bay Packers in 1980, completing 18 of 22 passes for 316 yards and three touchdowns. The game marked the first time since 1970 that a Bears quarterback threw for more than 300 yards.

After losing the season opener in his final USC season, the Trojans won their next 10 games with Evans at quarterback and ended up ranked the No. 2 team in the nation.

College
Vince Evans played high school football for Ben L. Smith High in Greensboro, North Carolina. He is one of six players from that program that went on to play pro football. The list includes former Washington Redskins center Jeff Bostic and his brother Joe. Former Pittsburgh Steelers tight end Eric Ebron also attended Ben L. Smith.

Evans  enrolled at USC and saw his first action during the 1974 season. While at USC, Evans played for future Tampa Bay Buccaneers head coach John McKay, and served as an understudy to Pat Haden, who'd later play in the NFL as a member of the Los Angeles Rams. In his first season of action, Evans completed six of sixteen passes for one touchdown and one interception. USC finished 10-1 and number two in the AP poll that season. The following season, with Haden graduated and off to the NFL, Evans took over as starter. Despite having the talented Ricky Bell and Mosi Tatupu in the backfield, the Trojans slipped to 8-4 and ranked 17 in the final AP poll that season. Even as a starter, Evans only attempted 112 passes that season, and the Trojans applied more of a ground attack than an air game. In Evans' senior season, John Robinson came aboard to replace McKay, as he left USC to coach the expansion team in Tampa Bay. Under Robinson, Evans had his best career season, stat wise. He completed 95 passes on 177 attempts, and for the first time, threw more touchdown passes, ten, versus interceptions, six. His primary target that season was receiver Sheldon Diggs, though Tatupu provided a target out of the backfield as well. USC's fortunes in the AP poll improved as well, as the team finished 11–1, with their only loss being the season opener to Missouri. After that, USC rolled off 11 straight wins, including a 56-0 blowout of the Iowa Hawkeyes. From there, USC defeated their Pac-8 opponents and even defeated rival Notre Dame 17–13. Evans led USC to a 14–6 win over Michigan in the 1977 Rose Bowl. Michigan had raced out to a 6–0 lead thanks to a rushing touchdown by Rob Lytle. The kick was missed. Evans led USC down the field later in the second quarter and ran the ball in the end zone himself. The extra point attempt by Glenn Walker was good and the Trojans lead 7–6. Charles White would score a rushing touchdown in the second half to put USC up for good.

Pro career
In 1977, the Bears selected Evans in the 6th round of the draft. Evans was the fourth player drafted by the Bears, behind tackle Ted Albrecht, defensive back Mike Spivey, and tight end Robin Earl. Evans made the team as a back-up behind Bob Avellini. Evans did not attempt a pass his rookie season. Instead, he was initially used as a kick returner. The Bears, under head coach Jack Pardee went 9-5 and made the playoffs. However, they were crushed by the Dallas Cowboys 37–7. Evans finally attempted his first NFL pass in 1978, coming off the bench late in a 40-7 blow out loss to the San Diego Chargers. Both Avellini and Mike Phipps were ineffective against the Chargers. Evans only completed one of three passes with one interception. The following season, under new head coach Neil Armstrong, the Bears went 10–6, with Evans getting a chance as a starter. However, he went 0–3. Avellini lost his starting job to Phipps and Evans was soon promoted ahead of Avellini. In 1980, Evans was a starter for 10 games, going 5-5 during the stretch. One of those games was the infamous Thanksgiving game in which the Bears won in overtime when running back Dave Williams returned the opening kickoff in overtime 95 yards for a touchdown. It was Evans himself that had tied the game when he scored on a four-yard run. However, the Bears missed the playoffs and finished 7–9. In 1981, Evans started all sixteen games. He threw for 2,354 yards, eleven touchdowns and twenty interceptions. When he became the starter, Evans became the first African-American quarterback to start for the Bears in franchise history. The Bears continued to slump, despite having all-pro Walter Payton in the backfield. At the end of the season, Armstrong was fired and the Bears hired Mike Ditka.

The Bears under Ditka restructured the quarterback rotation. Phipps was released, and Evans was a back-up again, this time to Jim McMahon, who the Bears selected in the first round of the 1982 draft. Evans would start three games for the Bears in 1983, going 1–2, but his time in Chicago was over. He balked at the idea of sharing the starting role with McMahon and turned down an offer to remain with the Bears. Instead, Evans jumped to the USFL. He signed a contract that was reported in the area of five million a year to sign with the Chicago Blitz. The contract made Evans one of the highest paid quarterbacks in the league at the time. Evans was signed by the new team owners, as the previous ownership group sold their interest in the team to buy the new franchise in Arizona. In doing so, they took the Blitz head coach, George Allen and the starting quarterback Greg Landry with them. New ownership named Marv Levy as the head coach and signed Evans as their starting quarterback.

Evans played only one season for the Blitz. In that season, he completed 200 passes on 411 attempts in the wide open offense that featured running back Tim Spencer and former Notre Dame star Kris Haines at receiver. Once again he threw more interceptions (22) than he did touchdowns (14). The Blitz finished 5–13 and in fifth place. The next season, with the Blitz folded, Evans joined the Denver Gold. Again, he threw more interceptions than he did touchdowns. He split time with Bob Gagliano but the Gold finished with an 11–7 record. After that 1985 season, the USFL made their ill-fated decision to abandon spring football and try and play in the fall. Because of this, Evans did not play football in 1986. During this time, Evans sued the former ownership of the Blitz. Evans claimed he was owed money from arbitration that was never paid.

In 1987, the Los Angeles Raiders were in need of a quarterback. Jim Plunkett was battling with a shoulder issue, and former first round pick Marc Wilson had failed to live up to lofty expectations. The team also had Rusty Hilger who they hoped to develop into a starter. Then the NFLPA strike loomed. Evans signed with the Raiders, as did Mark van Allen, a division III quarterback that had been in camp with the Raiders. Wilson ended up crossing the picket line. The strike turned out to be Evans' way back in the NFL and it turned out to be his longest lasting tenure with one team as a professional. Over the course of the next several seasons, despite an ever changing cast at quarterback, Evans remained the back-up, serving as much as a coach as he did a back-up. In 1991, he served as a third string quarterback behind Jay Schroeder and Todd Marinovich. In 1992, Evans saw spot duty as the Raiders fell to 7-9 under coach Art Shell. In 1993, Schroeder left the Raiders for the Cincinnati Bengals and Marinovich was cut. The Raiders turned to Jeff Hostetler who a few seasons prior had led the New York Giants to a Super Bowl. In 1994, at the age of 38, Evans returned for another season with the Raiders. In 1994, at the age of 39, Evans re-signed with the Raiders to serve as their back up. Briefly substituting for Hostetler, Evans complete all two of his passes, including a touchdown pass to Raghib Ismail in the Raiders 24–17 win over the Chargers. In 1995, the Raiders returned to the city of Oakland, and they brought Vince Evans with them. Art Shell was fired and Mike White was named head coach. Hostetler was still the starter but the Raiders drafted Billy Joe Hobert out of the University of Washington to be the quarterback of the future. 1995 would be Evans' final year as an active player. Despite being 40 years old, Evans made three starts for the Raiders, going 1-2 during that span. In his first start that season, he led the Raiders to a 30–17 win over the Indianapolis Colts, a team quarterbacked by Jim Harbaugh. His next start came on the road against the San Diego Chargers. In a game that featured no touchdowns by either team, Evans threw three interceptions, all to Chargers defensive back Dwayne Harper as the Raiders lost 12–6. Evans was the starter the next week against the Kansas City Chiefs. He went 23 of 37 with two interceptions before he was relieved by Hobert. It would be the last start of Evans' career, and the Raiders lost 29–23 to fall to 8–5. Evans made a brief appearance the following week in the Raiders 31–28 loss to the Denver Broncos.

Bears score 61 against Green Bay
The Green Bay Packers and Chicago Bears is one of the longest rivalries in the NFL. Vince Evans was on the right side of the most lopsided Bears/Packers game of all time. The date was December 7, 1980. This was the second meeting between the Bears and Packers that season. In the first match-up, the Packers won in overtime when Packers placekicker Chester Marcol advanced a blocked field goal 25 yards for a touchdown. The rematch started off slow, until Walter Payton scored three times in the second quarter to give the Bears a halftime lead. Evans himself accounted for three touchdown passes. The Green Bay fan base was upset that after Payton and many of the starters were pulled in the second half, Payton re-entered the game to score a rushing touchdown to make it 55–7. While Evans had one of his best games as a pro, the significance of the outcome was that the Bears had failed to score a single touchdown in the three previous meetings against the Packers.

Post NFL career
Evans later admitted he let his ego get in the way when he bolted the NFL for the USFL. Jim McMahon ended up getting injured during his rookie season, which means Evans would have gotten more playing time. After the USFL folded, Evans figured his resume would get him a look from teams in the NFL. It didn't and the only door that opened was when the players went on strike and owners decided to continue the season with replacement players. Evans was one of a few that was kept by the Raiders after the strike ended. Though he admitted that playing in the USFL was a mistake, he felt proud that he was firm in playing quarterback in the NFL, though he felt more pressure as an African-American playing quarterback in the NFL. He was happy to see Doug Williams become the first African-American quarterback to win a Super Bowl. After leaving football, Evans built a successful real estate career in Southern California.

References

1955 births
Living people
American football quarterbacks
Chicago Bears players
Chicago Blitz players
Denver Gold players
Los Angeles City Cubs football players
Los Angeles Raiders players
National Football League replacement players
Oakland Raiders players
USC Trojans football players
African-American players of American football
Players of American football from Greensboro, North Carolina
21st-century African-American people
20th-century African-American sportspeople